DWCI (105.1 FM), broadcasting as 105.1 Adjo FM, is a radio station owned and operated by the Municipal Government of Piddig. The station's studio is located at the Municipal Hall Complex, Brgy. Anao, Piddig, Ilocos Norte. This serves as the community station of the town of Piddig.

References

Radio stations in Ilocos Norte
Radio stations established in 2014